The Hawaii Amateur Golf Championship is an annual golf tournament held in the U.S. state of Hawaii.

History 
In 1928, an amateur golf tournament entitled the Territory of Hawaii Amateur Medal-Play Championship began. The champion of the tournament won the Atherton Cup. According to the Hawaii State Golf Association, "This championship brought together the finest amateur golfers in the territory of Hawaii." This event ran until 1949.

In 1964, the Hawaii Amateur was inaugurated by Arthur "Babe" Carter. It was held at Waialae Country Club through the mid-1980s. In 1987, the tournament moved to Pearl Country Club to accommodate more players. The tournament has been continuously held at Pearl CC except for 1995 when the Hawaii Amateur was held at Kapolei Golf Course.

Winners 

Source:

References 

Golf in Hawaii
Amateur golf tournaments in the United States